Benjamin Sherman (born April 5, 1881, date of death unknown) was an American athlete. He competed in the men's hammer throw at the 1908 Summer Olympics and the 1912 Summer Olympics.

References

External links
 

1881 births
Year of death missing
Athletes (track and field) at the 1908 Summer Olympics
Athletes (track and field) at the 1912 Summer Olympics
American male hammer throwers
Olympic track and field athletes of the United States